Pete Fromm (born September 29, 1958) is an American novelist, short story writer, and memoir writer.

Biography
Fromm was born in Shorewood, Wisconsin, and holds a B.S. in wildlife biology from the University of Montana where he graduated with honors in 1981. A five-time winner of the Pacific Northwest Booksellers Literary Award, he is the author of five short story collections, five novels, and two memoirs. In 2007 he wrote the screenplay for the short film DRY RAIN (CHINOOK in France), based on his story of the same name, and in 2013 the film of his novel, AS COOL AS I AM (LUCY IN THE SKY), was released, starring Claire Danes, James Marsden, and Sarah Bolger.  His latest novel, A JOB YOU MOSTLY WON'T KNOW HOW TO DO (LA VIE EN CHANTIER), was published in May 2019 in the US, and September 2019 in France.  He has been on the faculty of Pacific University's MFA in Writing program since 2005, and lives in Montana.

Works

Novels
A Job You Mostly Won't Know How To Do, 2019 (La Vie En Chantier, 2019)If Not For This, 2014 (Mon Désir Le Plus Ardent, 2018)As Cool As I Am, 2003 (Lucy In The Sky, 2015)How All This Started, 2000 (Comment Tout A Commencé, 2013)Monkey Tag (young adult novel) (1994)

MemoirIndian Creek Chronicles: A Winter in the Wilderness, 1993 (Indian Creek, 2006)The Names of the Stars: A Life in the Wilds, 2017 (Le Nom Des Etoiles, 2016)

Short Story collectionsThe Tall Uncut (1992)King of the Mountain: Sporting Stories (1994)Dry Rain, 1997  (Chinook, 2011)Blood Knot, 1998 (Avant La Nuit, 2010)Night Swimming (1999)

Awards
Fromm has been awarded the Pacific Northwest Booksellers Association Award five times: in 1994 for the memoir Indian Creek Chronicles; in 1998 for the story collection Dry Rain; in 2001 for the novel, How All This Started: in 2004 for the novel As Cool As I Am, and in 2015 for the novel If Not For This''.

External links
Interview with Pete Fromm on Pacific Northwest Booksellers
Article about Pete Fromm in SpokesmanReview.com

video: Fromm on reading

1958 births
20th-century American novelists
21st-century American novelists
American male novelists
Living people
Pacific University faculty
Writers from Montana
20th-century American male writers
21st-century American male writers
Novelists from Oregon